Bergesen is a surname. Notable people with the surname include:

Berge Sigval Natanael Bergesen (1914–1965), Norwegian shipowner
Brad Bergesen (born 1985), professional baseball player
Finn Bergesen (1945–2012), Norwegian businessperson
Helge Ole Bergesen (1949–2015), Norwegian political scientist and politician
Morten Sigval Bergesen (born 1951), Norwegian shipowner
Ole Bergesen (1832–1899), Norwegian priest and politician
Ole Bergesen (1891–1955), Norwegian shipowner
Ole Bergesen (1916–1965), Norwegian jurist and politician
Sigval Bergesen (1863–1956), Norwegian shipowner and politician
Sigval Bergesen the Younger (1893–1980), Norwegian shipowner

Norwegian-language surnames